Bohay is a surname. Notable people with the surname include:

Gary Bohay (born 1960), Canadian sport wrestler
Heidi Bohay (born 1959), American actress and television presenter
Bohay surname is also found in Kurukshetra district, Haryana, India.
This surname belong to ‘ https://en.m.wikipedia.org/wiki/Jats’ tribe.